A minor arc may refer to:
An arc that is smaller than a semicircle
A term that arises in connection with the Hardy–Littlewood circle method